The pandero is a musical instrument of the membranophone family consisting of a circular frame, often made of wood or plastic, with a single head of skin stretched over it. It is played in folk music of Latin-America, Spain and Portugal. In many of these countries, when the frame has pairs of small metal jingles, it is called pandereta. In some countries, terms pandero and pandereta are interchangeable. It is played by tapping the head with fingers or palm.

Gallery

References

 The Concise Garland Encyclopedia of World Music, Volume 1. (2008). .

Membranophones